"Stannie Get Your Gun" is the seventh episode of the second season and the fourteenth overall episode of the animated comedy series American Dad!. It aired on Fox in the United States on November 20, 2005, and is written by Brian Boyle and directed by John Aoshima.

In the episode, Hayley accidentally paralyzes Stan when she fires a gun she thought was loaded with blanks, while Roger tricks Steve into thinking he is not really his parents' son.

Plot

Francine is tired of Stan and Hayley's constant bickering; in this instance, gun control fuels the debate (Hayley favours it while Stan is against it). Forced by Francine to make amends, Stan takes Hayley to her favorite amusement park, 'Sugar Mountain,' only to reveal on arrival that the park has long since closed. On its site is NGALand, a gun-themed park owned by the National Gun Association (a parody of the National Rifle Association). Disgusted at how America encourages kids to take up firearms, Hayley grabs a guitar and sings an anti-gun song, getting her and Stan thrown out and Stan's membership revoked. Stan stages a robbery so that Hayley is forced to use a gun to save the family.

Hayley shoots the robber but feels conflicted afterwards, until she learns it was just a ploy to get her to apologize so Stan can recover his NGA membership. Angry, she grabs Stan's gun and, with what Stan mistakenly tells her are blank rounds, shoots him in the neck, rendering him quadriplegic and reliant on a wheelchair. Feeling hugely guilty, Hayley agrees to help Stan by singing appalling pro-gun songs at NGALand. At the break, Francine sees what the trauma has done to Hayley and inspires Stan to rethink. For the encore, Stan defies the park's management and the pair sing Hayley's anti-gun song instead, sending out the message that guns are bad. The old NGALand mascot (sacked because of Stan) uses the opportunity to try to kill Hayley to get his job back, but Stan takes the bullet. In hospital, it is revealed that the second bullet dislodged the first bullet with the result that Stan recovers completely and, much to the appall of Francine and Hayley, believes that "guns heal the sick", once again pro-guns.

Meanwhile, Roger gets angry at Steve for stealing a cookie that Francine had saved for him. Driven mad by Steve's declaration of "you snooze, you lose," he sets out to gain revenge on Steve by convincing him that he was adopted.  He begins operating on a small scale, by pointing out the minor differences between Steve and his parents.  As the show progresses, Roger's tactics become more demented; he even goes so far as to destroy all the photos and videos of Steve as a baby.  Steve is eventually convinced that he was adopted, even going so far as to commit minor incest by French kissing his sister (leaving Hayley traumatized). Roger searches the FBI database looking for a child that fits Steve's profile, and sends him to a couple whose son was kidnapped when he was an infant. Roger insists that they are his real parents (as well as that they are a Norwegian sailing family), and coaxes him into wearing a sailor outfit.  Steve greets the family enthusiastically, and they are overjoyed at the return of their "son."  When Roger exposes his ploy, Steve, rather than becoming angry, congratulates him on organizing such a clever ruse, much to the horrified couple's disappointment. As the episode ends in Stan's hospital room, Hayley sits in Roger's seat and declares "the Early bird gets the worm." As before, Roger slowly repeats her words, implying that he is planning to get revenge on her as well.

Reception
Ryan Budke of AOL TV gave the episode a mixed review, saying "Once again, I was more interested in American Dad subplots and stories than the main one. The gun story was still funny, just not as well done as Roger and Steve's. I just loved Roger getting even with Steve, and not just because I'm a lover of practical jokes and pranks, or petty revenge... Well ok, those are exactly the reasons, but it was still funny as crap in my opinion. I just get tired of seeing the ways that Stan and Haley disagree, it seems like a record skipping to me." Daniel Solomon of Cinema Blend gave the episode a mixed review, saying "Stannie Get Your Gun," "is a classic Colbert turnaround on Republican values. Stan argues with Haley  over gun control, and ends up being accidentally shot and paralyzed by her. Instead of changing his stance, he uses his disability to promote guns. The political views of the show's producers are made well-known throughout the series, and this episode certainly starts the ball rolling. Also, a rather cheesy ending foretells a future of sappy conclusions to come." The episode was watched by a total of 8.19 million people; this made it the third most-watched show on Animation Domination that night, beating King of the Hill but losing to Family Guy and The Simpsons, which had 10.3 million viewers.

References

External links 
 

2005 American television episodes
American Dad! (season 2) episodes